Louis F. Lockwood (1864 – c. 1908) was an architect in Minnesota.  Several of his works are listed on the National Register of Historic Places.

He was a nephew of Henry Francis Lockwood (1811–1878), English architect.

He partnered briefly in 1908 with architect Peter Linhoff.

Works include:
Vienna and Earl Apartment Buildings (1907), 682-688 Holly Ave., St. Paul, MN (Lockwood, Louis F.), NRHP-listed 
 Kimball Prairie Village Hall (1908), Main St. and Hazel, Kimball, MN (Lockwood, Louis), NRHP-listed
Robert C. Dunn House, 708 S. 4th St., Princeton, MN (Lockwood, Louis), NRHP-listed
At least seven houses that are contributing buildings in the NRHP-listed West Summit Avenue Historic District:
T.D. Laughlin House (1905), 1135 Summit Avenue, Classical Revival style house, and carriage house
Mrs. B. Knuppe House (1899), 1381 Summit Avenue, American Foursquare house
Clarence H. Slocum House (1899), 1382 Summit Avenue, Craftsman style house
William David Stewart House (1907), 1410 Summit Avenue, Tudor Revival
John A. Swenson House (1900), 1411 Summit Avenue, American Foursquare
Arthur W. Wallace House (1906), 1515 Summit Avenue, Classical Revival
Mrs. Francis J. Connell House (1906), 1726 Summit Avenue, Classical Revival
At least five contributing buildings in NRHP-listed Historic Hill District:
C.A, Bettigen House (1900), 825 Goodrich Avenue, mix of Queen Anne and medieval revival modes
Dr. L.C. Bacon House (1898), 737 Fairmount Avenue, cubiform
Skea-Skaret House (1906), 808 Fairmount Avenue, Neo-classic/Georgian
J.R. Beggs House (1907), 922 Portland Avenue, square-plan, hipped roof (perhaps American Foursquare?)
F. Whitman House (1903), 947 Portland Avenue, "typical of the transitional phase between the Queen Anne and the Medieval Revivals"

References

American architects
Architects from Minnesota
1864 births
1900s deaths
Year of death uncertain